The Lester Patrick Trophy has been presented by the National Hockey League and USA Hockey since 1966 to honor a recipient's contribution to ice hockey in the United States. It is considered a non-NHL trophy because it may be awarded to players, coaches, officials, and other personnel outside the NHL.  The trophy is named after Lester Patrick (1883–1960), player and longtime coach of the New York Rangers, who was a developer of ice hockey.

History
The Lester Patrick Trophy was presented by the New York Rangers in 1966. It honors the late Lester Patrick, who was a general manager and coach of the club. It is presented annually for "outstanding service to hockey in the United States". Players, coaches, referees, and executives are eligible to receive the trophy, and are chosen by a committee including the National Hockey League (NHL) commissioner and a governor, a representative of the New York Rangers; and a previous inductee into the Hockey Hall of Fame's builder section, Hockey Hall of Fame player's section, U.S. Hockey Hall of Fame, NHL Broadcasters' Association, and the Professional Hockey Writers' Association. The trophy's first recipient was Jack Adams.

108 individuals, and three teams, have been given the trophy. The trophy has been given to women on two occasions; in 1999, the 1998 U.S. Olympic Women's Ice Hockey Team was presented the trophy along with Harry Sinden, and in 2007, Cammi Granato individually won the trophy. Granato was also a member of the 1998 U.S. Olympic Women's Ice Hockey Team that received the trophy in 1998.

Recipients
† - Trophy was awarded posthumously.

Notes and references

General

Specific

National Hockey League trophies and awards
Awards established in 1966